Goal is a 2018 Sri Lankan Sinhala children's film directed by Rohan Perera and produced by Susara Dinal for Maharaja Entertainments as a Sirasa Movie. It stars Jayalath Manoratne and Chandani Seneviratne in lead roles along with Anula Bulathsinhala and Kaushalya Fernando. Music composed by Suresh Maliyadde. It is the 1309th Sri Lankan film in the Sinhala cinema.

Plot
The film revolves around a bunch of talented boys in a very remote school Millawitiya Junior School in Kaluwara Eliya. The fate of the children changes when new coming teacher, Samarasekara Sir (played by Manoratne) introduces them to football, an alien game to the children until that point.

Reluctant at first, the kids slowly get into the game. The adults are unsure at first, saying it a waste of time, but as the kids begin to improve and their enthusiasm growing, they support them. 

Facing schools outside Colombo, with kids who have almost lifetimes of practice, they move forward. They end up winning against a most renowned school in all of Sri Lanka, making a name for themselves.

Cast
 Jayalath Manoratne as Somaweera Samarasekara
 Chandani Seneviratne as Mrs. Samarasekara
 Anula Bulathsinhala as Grandmother
 Kaushalya Fernando as Village school principal 
 Nayana Hettiarachchi as Kalpa's mother
 Lakshman Mendis as Principal
 Jayani Senanayake as Tharindu's mother

Child cast
The film consists of more than 70 new child actors.
 Mohomad Sham as Jabus
 Kavindu Kalhara as Kalpa
 Rizan Naizer as Sahan
 Theshan Thushmika as Rachira
 Dananjaya Naveen as Vihanga
 Devid Karunarathna as Sandun
 Pavan Bimsara as Pabalu
 Subhashini Jayarathna

Soundtrack
Released under M Entertainments label in 2018, all three songs in the soundtrack were penned by director Rohan Perera.
Music directed by Suresh Maliyadde.

Accolades

References

External links (trailers and info)
 
 Goal on YouTube

2018 films
2010s Sinhala-language films